Beautiful Life Television (BLTV), known as Buddha's Light Television from 1997 to 2002, is a non-profit, faith-based television station in Taiwan owned by the Fo Guang Shan Dharma TV Foundation and founded by the Buddhist master Hsing Yun in 1997. It is one of several Buddhist-based TV channels in Taiwan, the others being Da Ai Television, Hwazan Television, Buddha Compassion Television, Life Television and Universal Culture Television.

References

1997 establishments in Taiwan
Television stations in Taiwan
Chinese-language television stations
Television channels and stations established in 1997
Companies based in Taipei
Mass media in Taipei
Buddhist television
Buddhist media in Taiwan